Sophie Helene Cecilie of Schönburg-Waldenburg (21 May 1885 – 3 February 1936) was Princess of Albania from 7 March to 3 September 1914 as the wife of Prince Wilhelm. In 1906 she married Wilhelm, second son of the Prince of Wied. When her husband became prince of Albania, Sophie became princess consort. However, in Albania she was referred to as Mbretëreshë, or Queen.

Early life
Princess Sophie was born in Potsdam, Brandenburg, Prusia, as daughter of Hereditary Prince Otto Karl Viktor I von Schönburg-Waldenburg (1856-1888) and his wife, Princess Lucie zu Sayn-Wittgenstein-Berleburg (1859-1903).

Both of Princess Sophie's parents died when she was young, so she spent much of her youth at the Castle Hemius in Fântânele estate in Moldavia, which was owned by her maternal relatives.

Marriage and issue
On 30 November 1906 at Waldenburg, Saxony Princess Sophie married Prince Wilhelm of Wied, son of William, Prince of Wied (1845-1907) and Princess Marie of the Netherlands (1841-1910). Sophie's husband, Prince Wilhelm was related to Wilhelm II, German Emperor, being his second cousin. They had two children:
Princess Marie Eleonore of Albania (1909–1956) ⚭ Prince Alfred of Schönburg-Waldenburg (1905-1941), son of Prince Heinrich of Schönburg-Waldenburg and Princess Olga of Löwenstein-Wertheim-Freudenberg ⚭ Ion Octavian Bunea (1899-1977)
Carol Victor, Hereditary Prince of Albania (1913–1973) ⚭ Eileen de Coppet (1922-1985)

Albanian ancestry
She had some remote Albanian ancestry, being a descendant of Princess Elena Callimachi, daughter of Prince Scarlat Ghica (1715-1766) (Prince of Moldavia and Prince of Wallachia), and his wife, Princess Ruxandra Muruzi. She has also descended from Princess Ruxandra Ghica, daughter of Grigore I Ghica (1628-1675), Prince of Wallachia and his wife, Princess Maria Strurdza. Although officially Romanian, the Ghica Princely family has Albanian roots.

Princess of Albania

Princess Sophie was close to her husband's aunt Queen Elisabeth of Romania, whom she had known since moving to Romania after the death of her parents. Princess Sophie and Queen Elisabeth sang, painted, composed and played musical instruments together. Queen Elisabeth played an important role in getting Princess Sophie's husband William the Albanian throne by asking Take Ionescu to persuade the great powers to select William. Princess Sophie and Queen Elisabeth both worked to overcome William's reluctance to accept the throne.

Eventually William agreed, and on 21 February 1914, Prince William and Princess Sophie hosted a delegation of Albanian notables at their castle in Neuwied, where William was formally offered the throne. The Albanian delegation then visited Waldenburg, Saxony, where they paid their respects to Princess Sophie's family.

Sophie and her husband arrived in Albania on 7 March 1914, in Durrës, the provisional capital. Sophie and Wilhelm were not make a success in Albania: they were strangers to the culture and sought to introduce habits which were normal for royalty in Western Europe but unknown in Albania. Sophie showed no interest in politics. Her representational duties and disinterest in state affairs were considered ideal for a royal consort in Western Europe and modelled after her mentor queen Elizabeth of Romania.
Edith Durham, who met them in Durrës, described them thus: 
"They are very royal – both of them [...] keep a court and keep people standing in their presence. It is all ludicrous [...] her [Sophie's] only idea is to play lady bountiful, distribute flowers, put medals on the wounded and make tiny blouses of native embroidery." 

Her Albanian adventure proved short-lived. On 3 September 1914, with the country in turmoil, Princess Sophie and Prince William left Albania, never to return. However, she officially remained the Princess of Albania until 31 January 1925, when the country was declared a republic.

On 3 February 1936, Princess Sophie died at Fântânele, Romania.

Ancestry

See also
Principality of Albania
List of Albanian consorts

References

External links

1885 births
1936 deaths
People from Potsdam
People from the Province of Brandenburg
Princesses consort of Albania
Albanian royalty
German princesses
House of Wied-Neuwied
House of Schönburg-Waldenburg